Sir Michael le Fleming, 4th Baronet (1748–1806) was a British politician who sat in the House of Commons for 32 years from 1774 to 1806.

Fleming was the only son of Sir William Fleming, 3rd Baronet of Rydal, Westmorland, and his wife  Elizabeth Petyt, daughter of Christopher Petyt of Skipton, Yorkshire and was born on 10 December 1748. His father died when he was nine on 31 March 1757 and he succeeded to the baronetcy. Sir James Lowther became his ward. Fleming was educated at Eton College from 1760 to 1765. In 1770 he became High Sheriff of Cumberland and in 1779 was Lieutenant.-colonel in the Westmorland. Militia.

At the  1774 general election Fleming was returned as Member of Parliament for Westmorland jointly with Sir James Lowther after a contest. In parliament he followed  Lowther in his politics and made little impression. He was returned unopposed in  1780, 1784, 1790, 1796 and  1802.

Fleming was described as “a most abandoned profligate.”  However, his friend James Boswell described him as “a very fashionable baronet in the brilliant world, who had a great love of literature”. Fleming married  Lady Diana Howard, daughter of Thomas Howard, 14th Earl of Suffolk  on 23 November 1782, but  in 1793 she was said to be on the verge of leaving him. He died on 19 May 1806. He was succeeded in the baronetcy by his cousin Sir Daniel Fleming who married Anne his only legitimate daughter.

External links
Westmorland Gazette Playboy Baronet had ‘fun’ in Paris in 1770 28 July 29 2011</ref>

References

1748 births
1806 deaths
People educated at Eton College
Baronets in the Baronetage of England
High Sheriffs of Cumberland
Members of the Parliament of Great Britain for English constituencies
British MPs 1774–1780
British MPs 1780–1784
British MPs 1784–1790
British MPs 1790–1796
British MPs 1796–1800
Members of the Parliament of the United Kingdom for English constituencies
UK MPs 1801–1802
UK MPs 1802–1806